The Swingles are a vocal group formed in 1974 in England by Ward Swingle. The group replaced Swingle's earlier "Swingle Singers", formed in 1962 in Paris, France, with Anne Germain, Claude Germain, Jeanette Baucomont, Christiane Legrand, Claudine Meunier, Jean-Claude Briodin, and Jean Cussac.

History
The French group, directed originally by Ward Swingle (who once belonged to Mimi Perrin's French vocal group Les Double Six), began as session singers mainly doing backing vocals for singers such as Charles Aznavour and Edith Piaf. Christiane Legrand, sister of Michel Legrand, was the original lead soprano with the group. The ensemble sang some jazz vocals for Michel Legrand.  The eight session singers sang through Bach's Well-Tempered Clavier as a sight-reading exercise and found the music to have a natural swing. They recorded their first album Jazz Sébastien Bach as a present for friends and relatives. Many radio stations picked it up and this led to the group recording more albums and winning a total of five Grammy Awards. The French group performed and recorded typically with only a double bass and drums as accompaniment.

In 1973, Ward Swingle disbanded the original French group when he and his family moved to England. He later hired members who debuted as Swingle II with its initial emphasis moved from classical music to a cappella arrangements of madrigals and then on to other styles. The current group performs primarily, but not exclusively, a cappella and over the decades has explored a wide range of styles, from show tunes to rock to avant garde to world folkloric music to straight ahead jazz to classical, including the entire repertoire of the original Swingle Singers.

The group performed and recorded under the name The Swingles, The New Swingle Singers, and The Swingle Singers before settling on The Swingles. Since Ward Swingle started the second group, it has never disbanded. Until 2011, the group consisted of eight voices: two sopranos, two altos, two tenors and two basses. As individual members have left the group, remaining members have held auditions for replacements. Ward Swingle continued as a performer in the group until retiring to the United States in 1984 and taking the role of "musical adviser" to the Swingles until his death in 2015.

Performances
An early hit for the group was Bach's "Air on the G String", recorded with the Modern Jazz Quartet; it has been used as the theme tune to a popular Italian TV Show, Superquark, as well as the Swedish Children's program, Beppes godnattstund, hosted by Beppe Wolgers. Luciano Berio wrote his postmodern symphony Sinfonia for eight voices and orchestra in 1968 with the Swingle Singers in mind (appearing on the original premiere recording with the New York Philharmonic). They also premiered Berio's A-Ronne in 1974, which they later recorded. They also recorded Ben Johnston's "Sonnets of Desolation" in 1984.

In 2005, their recording of Bach's Prelude in F Minor was incorporated into the hit single "They", by Jem Griffiths; the piece was also used in the 2006 film The Gigolos. The group's music has a trademark sound and is used frequently on television (The West Wing, Sex and the City, Miami Vice, Glee), in movies (Bach's Fugue in G Minor (BWV 578) in Thank You for Smoking, Mozart's "Horn Concerto No. 4" in Wedding Crashers, Bach's "Prelude No.7 in E flat [The Well Tempered Clavier – Book 2 BWV 876]" in Milk).

The London group sang with French pop star Étienne Daho on his songs "Timide intimité" and "Soudain" from his 1996 album Eden, and with the Style Council on their song "The Story of Someone's Shoe" from the 1988 album Confessions of a Pop Group. They appeared several times on the BBC Television sketch show The Two Ronnies in the early 1970s.

The Swingle Singers produce covers ranging from pop songs (Björk, Annie Lennox and the Beatles) to classical music (Bach, Mozart) to Contemporary Music (Luciano Berio, Pascal Zavaro and Azio Corghi). Their arrangements are often infused with jazz harmonies and stylings.

The Swingle Singers are curators of the London A Cappella Festival, based at Kings Place.

In December 2022, the current members are:
Joanna Goldsmith-Eteson (soprano, UK)
Federica Basile (soprano, Italy) 
Imogen Parry (alto, UK), daughter of former Swingle, Ben Parry
Oliver Griffiths (tenor, UK)
Jon Smith (tenor, US) 
Jamie Wright (baritone and vocal percussionist, UK)  replaced Kevin Fox, who left in 2019.
Tom Hartley  (bass, UK) (since June 2022) 
Sound engineer: Max Hunter (UK)

In September 2011, Lucy Bailey (alto) left the group and the Swingle Singers announced the decision not to replace her, but to continue as a seven-person line-up.

On 1 November 2011, both Christiane Legrand and Swingles composer André Hodeir died.

Tobias Hug departed the group in 2012. That year, as BFG or Black Forest Ghetto (referencing his place of birth), he went on to found The Beatbox Collective, a London based human beatbox group who went on to becoming World Champions in the group or 'crew' category at the 2015 Beatbox World Championships in Berlin, Germany. He continued working internationally as a teacher, conductor, singer and beatboxer after studying a Masters Degree in Rhythmic Choir Conducting and Vocal Leadership – a unique course only taught at the Royal Conservatory of Aarhus & Aalborg. After 2 years of treatment for Oesophageal cancer, during which he founded the Black Forest Voices international acapella festival, Tobias died in his hometown of Kirchzarten in January 2020 a few days after his 44th birthday.

In September 2014, the French blog Dans l'ombre des studios published Swingle Singers' Pavane for a Dead Princess (Maurice Ravel), a previously unreleased 1967 recording.

Ward Swingle, who formed the group, died at the age of 87 on 19 January 2015.

Discography

 Jazz Sebastien Bach (Philips, 1963)
 Anyone for Mozart? (Philips, 1964)
 Going Baroque (Philips, 1964)
 Les Romantiques (Philips, 1965)
 Place Vendome with Modern Jazz Quartet (Philips, 1966)
 Rococo a Go Go (Philips, 1966)
 Concerto D'Aranjuez: Sounds of Spain (Philips, 1967)
 J. S. Bach (Philips, 1968)
 Jazz Von Bach Bis Chopin (Philips, 1968)
 Noels Sans Passeport (Philips, 1968)
 Jazz Sebastian Bach Volume 2 (Philips, 1968)
 Sinfonia/Visage with Luciano Berio, New York Philharmonic, Cathy Berberian (CBS, 1969)
 American Look (Philips, 1969)
 Bitter Ending with Andre Hodeir (Epic, 1972)
 Les 4 Saisons (Philips, 1972)
 The Joy of Singing (Philips, 1972)
 Attention! The Swingle Singers (Fontana, 1973)
 Swinging Bach (Fontana, 1974)
 Jazz Meets Baroque (Fontana, 1976)
 Swingle Bells (Columbia, 1978)
 Swingle Skyliner (Columbia, 1979)
 Folio (MMG, 1980)
 Instrumentals (Polydor, 1986)
 Christmas (Polydor, 1986)
 Sinfonia Eindrucke with Orchestre National De France (Erato, 1986)
 Nothing but Blue Skies (Trax, 1988)
 1812 (Swingle Singers, 1989)
 The Bach Album (Swingle Singers, 1990)
 A Cappella Amadeus: A Mozart Celebration (Virgin, 1991)
 Around the World/Folk Music/An A Cappela Song Collection (Virgin, 1991)
 Notability (Swingle Singers, 1993)
 Bach Hits Back (Virgin, 1994)
 Pretty Ringtime: English Twentieth Century Songs (Swingle Singers, 1994)
 New World (Swingle Singers, 1995)
 The Story of Christmas (Primarily a Cappella 1998)
 Screen Tested (Swingle Singers, 1998)
 Ticket to Ride (Swingle Singers, 1999)
 Keyboard Classics (Swingle Singers, 2002)
 Mood Swings (Primarily a Cappella 2002)
 Retrospective: The 40th Anniversary Show (Sounds Good 2003)
 Unwrapped (Swingle Singers, 2004)
 Ferris Wheels (Swingle Singers, 2009)
 Weather to Fly (World Village 2013)
 Snapshots, Volume 1 (2020)
 Snapshots, Volume 2 (2021)

Past members 
Source =

References

External links
 Official site
 The Swingle Singers profile at singers.com
 Interviews of Swingle Singers Anne Germain and Claudine Meunier (French)
  BACH & friends Documentary

Musical groups established in 1974
Musical groups from Paris
British vocal groups
Professional a cappella groups
Vocalese singers
Grammy Award winners
Vocal jazz ensembles
1974 establishments in England